4 (pronounced Four) is the fourth studio album by Johan, released on 30 April 2009. Johan previously released new records every five years, but 4 was released only 3 years after THX JHN on the Excelsior Recordings label.

The first single of the album will be In The Park, first aired on 3FM on April 6, 2009.

Track listing
 "In The Park"
 "Something About You"
 "Maria"
 "Comes A Time"
 "The Receiving End"
 "Together Now"
 "World Game # 10"
 "Alone Again"
 "Over"
 "Why Don't We"

Personnel
 Jacco de Greeuw – lead singer, guitar
 Maarten Kooijman – guitar, backing vocals
 Diets Dijkstra – guitar (1999), bass, backing vocals
 Jeroen Kleijn – drums

References

Johan (band) albums
2009 albums